This is a list of companies based in Oakland, California, including both current and former businesses.

0-9

1-2-3-4 Go! Records
99Designs

A

AK Press
AMCO Chemical
Armor All
Ask.com
Atlas-Imperial

B

Babette (clothing line), defunct fashion line
BandCamp
BarNone
BART
Bay Area Mural Program, Mural Arts Program, art lessons. mural creation, community engagement.
Bay Area News Group
Blue Bottle Coffee Company
Bookpeople, defunct book distributor
BrightSource Energy
Broadly
Buenaventura Press
Brand X Huaraches - Family Owned & Operated Mexican Footwear Since 1973

C

CashBet
Catchword Branding
Ceres Imaging
Claremont Resort
Clorox
Colombo Baking Company
Comfy (Siemens)
Cost Plus, Inc.

D

Dreyer's

E

East Bay Express
Ecologic Brands, Inc.

F

Fageol
Fabric Genomics
Family Radio
Fentons Creamery
Fivetran
Free Range

G

Generation Tux
Glad, manufacturing
Golden West Financial
Goldie Blox
Granny Goose
GT Nexus

I

Independent Iron Works
Intrada Records

K

Kaiser Permanente
KTVU

L

LaunchDarkly
LendStreet
LifeRing Secular Recovery
Livescribe

M

Magnolia Editions
Marqeta
Matson, Inc., relocated to Hawaii in 2011
Moore Dry Dock Company
Mosaic Inc.
Mother's Cookies
Mynd Property Management

N

Namesys
New Harbinger Publications
New, Improved Recording
New Village Press
Next Thing Co.
Nexus Audio Recording Studio
Niman Ranch
Numi Organic Tea

O

Oakland Athletics
Oakland Roots SC
Oakland Terminal Railway
Oakland Tribune (corporate headquarters moved to San Jose; defunct as of April 2016)
Oaklandish
Oberheim Electronics
OneCalifornia Bank
Orb, software

P

Pac-West Telecomm
Pacific Coast Borax Company
Pacific Gas and Electric Company
Pandora Radio
Pet Food Express
Phat Beets Produce
PM Press

R
Red Bay Coffee
Roofstock

S
Safeway, moved to Pleasanton, California in 1996
San Francisco and Oakland Helicopter Airlines
Sequoia Voting Systems
Sungevity
Swarm Gallery

T
Thomas Guide
Transocean Airlines

V

Vaccination Records
Vidado (formerly Captricity)
VSCO

W

Y

Yoshi's, jazz nightclub
Your Black Muslim Bakery, defunct bakery

Z

Zhone Technologies

References

See also
List of companies based in the San Francisco Bay Area

Oakland, California-related lists
 
Oakland